Asante T. Samuel Sr. (born January 6, 1981) is an American former professional football player who was a cornerback in the National Football League (NFL). He was born in Accra, Ghana and raised in Fort Lauderdale, Florida. He played college football for the UCF Knights and was drafted by the New England Patriots in the fourth round of the 2003 NFL Draft. Samuel also played for the Philadelphia Eagles and Atlanta Falcons. He is the father of Asante Samuel Jr., a cornerback who was drafted by the Los Angeles Chargers.

Early years
Samuel was born in Accra, Ghana, and raised in Fort Lauderdale, Florida, where he attended Boyd H. Anderson High School in Lauderdale Lakes, Florida. As a junior quarterback, he threw for 1,800 yards and rushed for 500 yards. As a senior, Samuel concentrated on defense, and earned All-State honors, and finished his senior year with 4 interceptions and 75 tackles.  Samuel also managed kick and punt return duties.  Ten minutes before kickoff of Samuel's final high school game, he replaced his team's injured starting quarterback.  He threw two touchdown passes, intercepted two more, rushed for 80 yards, and even worked on special teams returning kicks and punts.  Samuel's top receiver in high school, Todd Devoe, later played for the Baltimore Ravens and Denver Broncos, and was a friend & teammate of future NFL defensive back Benny Sapp.  Samuel decreased his 40-yard dash time from 4.5 seconds during his sophomore year of high school to 4.39 seconds entering the NFL.

College career
Samuel attended the University of Central Florida, majored in business administration, and played for the UCF Knights football team.  He finished his college career with 127 tackles (102 solo, 25 assisted), 8 interceptions, and a school-record 38 passes deflected (the previous record was 34 deflections). Samuel also returned 63 punts for 673 yards, for an average of 10.7 yards per return.

Professional career

New England Patriots
The New England Patriots selected Samuel in the fourth round (120th overall) of the 2003 NFL Draft. The New England Patriots traded their fourth (128th overall) and fifth round (157th overall) picks to the Denver Broncos in exchange for Denver's fourth round pick (120th overall) in order to draft Samuel. Samuel was the 16th cornerback drafted in 2003.

On June 10, 2003, the New England Patriots signed Samuel to a four-year, $1.68 million contract.

At the start of the 2004 season, the Patriots' starting corners were Tyrone Poole and Ty Law. After both were sidelined by injuries, Samuel became a starter, and started for the Patriots in Super Bowl XXXIX. He would start at corner the following season, as he maintained that position for the rest of his tenure with the Patriots.

In 2006, the Patriots began the season with Samuel and Ellis Hobbs at cornerback. By the end of the regular season, Samuel had intercepted a career-high 10 passes, which put him in a tie for first in the 2006 season (with Champ Bailey of the Broncos); the mark is the second-best ever for a Patriot (in 1964 Ron Hall had 11). Samuel tied the Patriots' mark for most interceptions in a game when he picked off three passes in a week 12 game against the Chicago Bears.

He intercepted a pass and returned it for a touchdown twice in the 2006 NFL Playoffs: first against the New York Jets to clinch their 1st round victory and then in the AFC Championship Game against the Indianapolis Colts to extend the lead to 21–3.

On February 16, 2007, the Patriots placed the franchise tag on him.  After holding out for most of the preseason, Samuel signed the one-year $7.79 million tender on August 27, 2007, to fulfill his obligation under the franchise tag.  He was eligible for free agency again at the end of the 2007 season.  According to The Boston Globe, if Samuel participated in 60% of the defensive snaps or the Patriots win 12 games, his contract stipulated that the team would not place the franchise tag on him for the following season. Samuel finished the 2007 regular season with six interceptions, returning one for a touchdown.  During his franchised season, he was named to the 2008 Pro Bowl and helped lead the Patriots to Super Bowl XLII. Late in the game, Samuel dropped a pass thrown by Eli Manning that would have sealed up the Super Bowl for the Patriots. On the next play, Manning completed a pass to David Tyree known as the Helmet Catch that led to an upset.

Philadelphia Eagles

2008 season
Samuel was thought to be one of the most sought-after free agents of the 2008 NFL offseason. Within minutes of the start of free agency on February 29, 2008, Samuel was reportedly already setting up a meeting with the Philadelphia Eagles. Later that day, he signed a six-year, $56 million contract with the Eagles. Upon being signed, Samuel was quoted as saying, “I just want to be able to win and get back to the Super Bowl.” On August 22, 2008, he made his return to New England during the third week of the preseason. Asante Samuel made his regular season Eagles debut on September 7, 2008, against the St. Louis Rams. He was a Pro Bowl Reserve for his stellar play with 4 interceptions and one touchdown. It was Samuel's 2nd appearance in the Pro Bowl, his 1st with the Philadelphia Eagles. On January 4, 2009, Samuel returned an interception for a 44-yard touchdown, his fourth interception returned for a touchdown in the postseason which set an NFL record. The following week, Samuel picked off Eli Manning, returning the ball to the Giants' two-yard line.

2009 season
On December 20, 2009, against the San Francisco 49ers, Samuel made his eighth interception of the year to break Troy Vincent's record of seven interceptions in a season under head coach Andy Reid. Vincent set the record during the 1999 season.

With nine interceptions in 2009, Samuel tied for second in Eagles history for interceptions in a season, with Don Burroughs (1960) and Ed "Bibbles" Bawel (1955).

Samuel was selected to the 2010 Pro Bowl as a starter in recognition of his stellar season. The 2010 Pro Bowl was the fourth time that Samuel was chosen for the game.

Atlanta Falcons

The Atlanta Falcons acquired Samuel from the Eagles on April 25, 2012, in exchange for a seventh-round draft pick in 2012.

Although Samuel totaled five interceptions in the 2012 season, he only managed one in 2013, and on February 5, 2014, the Falcons released him.

Personal life
Samuel has a tattoo on his left arm that says "Get Rich To This." It was widely reported during Samuel's post-2006 season contract situation that the tattoo said "Get Paid".  Samuel's tattoo is the name of a Goodie Mob song that Samuel liked in college.

Samuel married his wife in 2012. Samuel's son, Asante Jr., was born in 1999 and played cornerback at Florida State University and was drafted by the Los Angeles Chargers in the 2021 NFL Draft.

References

External links

Philadelphia Eagles profile

1981 births
Living people
American football cornerbacks
Atlanta Falcons players
New England Patriots players
Philadelphia Eagles players
UCF Knights football players
American Conference Pro Bowl players
National Conference Pro Bowl players
Players of American football from Fort Lauderdale, Florida